The Mud River is a tributary of the Guyandotte River in southwestern West Virginia in the United States.  Via the Guyandotte and Ohio Rivers, it is part of the Mississippi River watershed.  The river is popular with muskellunge anglers.

The Mud River was so named on account of the muddy character of its water.

Course
The Mud River rises in Boone County, west of Madison, and flows generally northwestward for 72 mi (116 km) through Lincoln and Cabell counties, past the towns of Hamlin and Milton.  It meets the Guyandotte at the town of Barboursville. Near the stream's mouth, the Mud River meanders through the large, ancient valley of the Teays River.

See also
List of rivers of West Virginia

References

External links
Allrefer.com: Mud River location
WVgameandfish.com: Mud River popularity with anglers

Rivers of West Virginia
Tributaries of the Guyandotte River
Rivers of Boone County, West Virginia
Rivers of Cabell County, West Virginia
Rivers of Lincoln County, West Virginia